The 1872 Brazilian census was the first census carried out in Brazilian territory, during the imperial period. All residents in private and collective households (called "fogos") who were in it on the reference date of the census, which was 1 August 1872, were censused. The population was distributed according to color, sex, free or slave status, marital status, nationality, occupation and religion.

General Directorate of Statistics 
During the imperial period, the Brazilian government felt the need to obtain statistical data to better understand the country. Because of this, in 1871, by Decree No. 4,676, in compliance with Law No. 1,829, the General Directorate of Statistics (Diretoria Geral de Estatística, DGE) was created to organize national statistical activities and carry out, in the following year, the first census made in Brazil. With the establishment of the Republic, the new government reorganized the DGE and expanded its activities, implementing the civil registry of births, marriages and deaths. From 1890 onwards, carried out by the then General Directorate of Statistics, censuses took place every ten years, with the exception of 1910 and 1930, in which the political situation in Brazil prevented them from being carried out. The DGE was dissolved in 1931, and only in 1936 would an equivalent body be created, the Brazilian Institute of Geography and Statistics (IBGE).

Population profile 

The final results revealed that Brazil had 9,930,478 inhabitants, 5,123,869 men and 4,806,609 women. Men represented 51.6% and women 48.4% of the total population. Regarding the number of inhabitants, the results did not not include 181,583 inhabitants, estimated for 32 parishes, in which the census was not carried out on the given date.

According to the census, 38.3% were pardo, 38.1% white and 19.7% black. The indigenous population, named in the census as "caboclos", made up 3.9% of the total. After the 1872 census indigenous people remained for 101 years without appearing as a separate category in the population surveys, only returning in 1991. In the case of the indigenous, some due to the tone of skin, may have been classified as pardo, in addition, the vast majority of native peoples did not answer the census; several villages were not counted because it was difficult to reach them. Countless indigenous peoples lived in isolated tribes, preserving their primitive lifestyle.

In 1872 slaves represented 15.2% of the Brazilian population, of which 31% were counted as pardos. Some municipalities had more slaves than free people, as in Santa Maria Madalena, São João da Barra, Valença, Piraí and Vassouras, in Rio de Janeiro; Bananal, in São Paulo; Santa Cruz, in Bahia; and São Luiz Gonzaga, in Maranhão.

Foreigners made up 3.8% of Brazil's population. Of the total number of immigrants, 36% were slaves. “Africans”, slaves, free or freed, were the majority of foreigners (46%); followed by Portuguese (33%), Germans (10.5%), Italians (2.1%) and French (1.8%). Despite being included in the census simply as "Africans", most of them came from different ethnic groups from at least eight major regions of the African continent, such as Senegambia, the Gulf of Benin, West Central Africa and the Gulf of Biafra, and others.

Among the free population, 23.4% of men and 13.4% of women were considered literate. Of the population aged between 6 and 15, 17% of men and 11% of women attended schools. Population data by age group showed that 24.6% of the population were children under 10 years of age; 21.1% were adolescents and young people between 11 and 20 years old; 32.9% were adults between 21 and 40 years old; 8.4% were between 41 and 50 years old; 12.8% were between 51 and 70 years old; and, finally, only 3.4% were over 71 years of age.

99.7% of the population was classified as Catholic (9.900.888 people) and 0.29% (29.590) as non-Catholic. 80% of the "non-Catholics" were German immigrants. However, there were, at that time, about 383 thousand amerindians, who followed their own religious conceptions. Furthermore, all slaves were classified as Catholics, but many of them maintained the original Africann religions that, after the abolition of slavery, would give rise to Afro-Brazilian religions.

The census presents, in addition to the population count, specific information about people with disabilities, access to school and professions exercised, among others. At the time, farming was the profession with the most people, followed by domestic services. Of the liberal professions, artists were the most numerous, even among the slave population. Among women, the predominant professions were domestic service, farmers and seamstresses. From the total population (men and women), about 42% had no profession (55% among free people, 24% among slaves). The DGE itself recognizes that the contingent without a specific profession was “huge”, especially in the provinces of Rio Grande do Norte, Minas Gerais and Pernambuco.

The Census recorded almost 10 million inhabitants distributed in 20 provinces and the Neutral Municipality. Brazil was divided into 641 municipalities, which, in turn, were subdivided into 1,473 parishes, the smallest information units. The collection was carried out in the parishes.

In this Census, the current Northeast region still appeared as the largest in the country. Of the eight most populous provinces in Brazil, half were in the northeast, they were also among the most densely populated, since Pernambuco had a smaller area than São Paulo but with a larger population; and Paraíba, with almost the same population as Rio Grande do Sul, had a much smaller area as well. Residents of the present-day northeast and southeast regions combined made up 87.2% of the country's population.

In Imperial Brazil, contemporaries understood the country as being geographically divided into only two major regions: the north (the provinces located from Amazonas to Bahia) and the south (from Espírito Santo to Rio Grande do Sul). Thus, the northern population, that is, those who lived from Bahia to Amazonas, was 4,971,407 (50.06%) and those who lived in the other provinces, that is, the south, were 4,683,469 (47.16%); therefore, the population of the two regions was roughly equivalent, with a slight advantage to the north.

The Neutral Municipality, located between the southern provinces, had 274,972 inhabitants, about 2.77% of the country's population. Minas Gerais, with 2,039,735 inhabitants, was the most populous province and with the largest number of parishes (370), the better distribution of population in parishes (including urban and rural areas) in Minas Gerais was a remnant of the population emigration that resulted from the gold cycle, which had its heyday in the previous century and led to the move of Brazil's capital from Salvador to Rio de Janeiro in 1763 (the two largest cities in the 1872 census).

In 1872 the weight of the rural population was enormous when compared to the urban population. The population of provincial capitals and the Neutral Municipality represented 10.41% of the total population, that is, 1,083,039 people. To complete the picture, 48% of the urban population was concentrated in the cities of Rio de Janeiro, Salvador and Recife.

Results

Population by province

Population of the provincial capitals

Most populous municipalities in 1872

See also 
 Demographics of Brazil

References

Bibliography 
 

1872 censuses
Censuses in Brazil
1872 in Brazil